Nathanael Bongo Mbourou (born 24 August 1996) is a Gabonese professional footballer who plays as a central midfielder for Moldovan club FC Dinamo-Auto Tiraspol and the Gabon national team.

References

1996 births
Living people
Gabonese footballers
People from Lambaréné
Association football midfielders
CF Mounana players
Maritzburg United F.C. players
FC Dinamo-Auto Tiraspol players
Gabon Championnat National D1 players
South African Premier Division players
Gabon international footballers
Gabonese expatriate footballers
Gabonese expatriate sportspeople in South Africa
Expatriate soccer players in South Africa
Expatriate footballers in Moldova
21st-century Gabonese people